Big Talker may refer to:

 WYAY (FM), a radio station (106.3 FM) licensed to Bolivia, North Carolina, United States, which used the name from 2003 to 2013
 WFBT (FM), a radio station (106.7 FM) licensed to Carolina Beach, North Carolina, United States, which used the name from 2017 to 2021
 "Big Talker (Garfield and Friends)", an episode of the TV series Garfield and Friends